Patrick Koronkiewicz (born 13 March 1991) is a German professional footballer who plays as a right-back for Viktoria Köln.

Career
Koronkiewicz made his debut in the 3. Liga for Viktoria Köln on 3 August 2019, starting in the away match against Bayern Munich II. He assisted Mike Wunderlich for Köln's second goal, with the match finishing as a 5–2 win.

References

External links
 
 

1991 births
Living people
Sportspeople from Bonn
Footballers from North Rhine-Westphalia
German footballers
Germany youth international footballers
Association football fullbacks
Bayer 04 Leverkusen II players
RB Leipzig players
RB Leipzig II players
Sportfreunde Siegen players
FC Viktoria Köln players
3. Liga players
Regionalliga players